The cantons of Créteil are administrative divisions of the Val-de-Marne department, Île-de-France region, northern France. Since the French canton reorganisation which came into effect in March 2015, the city of Créteil is subdivided into 2 cantons. Their seat is in Créteil.

Population

References

Cantons of Val-de-Marne